Pestalosphaeria is a genus of fungi in the family Pestalotiopsidaceae.

The morphological characters of Pestalosphaeria comprise cylindrical asci with a J+ apical apparatus, ascospores uniseriate in the ascus, three cells, ellipsoid, and a pale dull brown color.

The genus name of Pestalosphaeria is in honour of Fortunato Pestalozza (died 1878), who was an Italian botanist and doctor who worked in Constantinople and Antalya. 

The genus was circumscribed by Margaret Elizabeth Barr-Bigelow in Mycologia vol.67 on page 188 in 1975.

Species
As accepted by Species Fungorum;
 Pestalosphaeria accidenta 
 Pestalosphaeria alpiniae  
 Pestalosphaeria austroamericana 
 Pestalosphaeria hansenii 
 Pestalosphaeria leucospermi 

Former species
 Pestalosphaeria concentrica  = Pestalotiopsis guepinii); Pestalotiopsidaceae
 Pestalosphaeria elaeidis  = Pseudopestalotiopsis elaeidis); Pestalotiopsidaceae
 Pestalosphaeria eugeniae  = Pestalotiopsis eugeniae); Pestalotiopsidaceae
 Pestalosphaeria gubae  = Pestalotiopsis neglecta); Pestalotiopsidaceae
 Pestalosphaeria jinggangensis  = Pestalotiopsis podocarpi); Pestalotiopsidaceae
 Pestalosphaeria maculiformans  = Pestalotiopsis maculiformans); Pestalotiopsidaceae
 Pestalosphaeria varia  = Pestalotiopsis besseyi); Pestalotiopsidaceae

References

External links
Index Fungorum

Xylariales